Balwina Land District is a land district (cadastral division) of Western Australia, located within the Eastern Land Division in the Great Sandy Desert. It spans roughly 19°30'S - 21°00'S in latitude and 126°25'E - 129°00'E in longitude.

The district includes part of the Shire of Halls Creek in the Kimberley region — most particularly the community of Balgo — as well as the easternmost part of the Shire of East Pilbara in the Pilbara region of the state.

History
The district was created on 13 April 1928, and was defined in the Government Gazette:

Landgate's GEONOMA database records that the name was suggested by Assistant Chief Draftsman, G. W. Paris, who stated it was an Aboriginal word meaning "waterhole". The database also notes that on 23 January 1987, the district was extended west to 126°E longitude; however, this was not gazetted.

References

Land districts of Western Australia
Kimberley (Western Australia)